Tritrabidae is a family of radiolarians in the order Spumellaria. They range in age from 235 to 125 million years.

References

External links 
 	

Polycystines
Radiolarian families